Amirabad (also Romanized as Amīrābād) is a village in Yekanat Rural District, Yamchi District, Marand County, East Azerbaijan Province, Iran. At the 2006 census, its population was 131, in 28 families.

References 

Populated places in Marand County